King's Cross railway station, also known as London King's Cross, is a passenger railway terminus in the London Borough of Camden, on the edge of Central London. It is in the London station group, one of the busiest stations in the United Kingdom and the southern terminus of the East Coast Main Line to North East England and Scotland. Adjacent to King's Cross station is St Pancras International, the London terminus for Eurostar services to continental Europe. Beneath both main line stations is King's Cross St Pancras tube station on the London Underground; combined, they form one of the country's largest and busiest transport hubs.

The station was opened in Kings Cross in 1852 by the Great Northern Railway on the northern edge of Central London to accommodate the East Coast Main Line. It quickly grew to cater to suburban lines and was expanded several times in the 19th century. It came under the ownership of the London and North Eastern Railway as part of the Big Four grouping in 1923, who introduced famous services such as the Flying Scotsman and locomotives such as Mallard. The station complex was redeveloped in the 1970s, simplifying the layout and providing electric suburban services, and it became a major terminus for the high-speed InterCity 125. In addition, Great Northern runs suburban commuter trains in and around north London.

In the late 20th century, the area around the station became known for its seedy and downmarket character, and was used as a backdrop for several films as a result. A major redevelopment was undertaken in the 21st century, including restoration of the original roof, and the station became well known for its association with the Harry Potter books and films, particularly the fictional Platform 9¾. Following extensive track remodelling in 2021, platform 10 was taken out of use, with platform 11 becoming the new 10.

Location and name
The station stands on the London Inner Ring Road at the eastern end of Euston Road, next to the junction with Pentonville Road, Gray's Inn Road and York Way, in what is now the London Borough of Camden. Immediately to the west, on the other side of Pancras Road, is St Pancras railway station. Several London bus routes, including 30, 59, 73, 91, 205, 390 and 476 pass in front of or to the side of the station.

King's Cross can be spelled both with and without an apostrophe. King's Cross is used in signage at the Network Rail and London Underground stations, on the Tube map and on the official Network Rail webpage. It rarely featured on early Underground maps, but has been consistently used on them since 1951. Kings X, Kings + and London KX are abbreviations used in space-limited contexts. The National Rail station code is KGX.

History

Early history
The area of King's Cross was previously a village known as Battle Bridge which was an ancient crossing of the River Fleet, originally known as Broad Ford, later Bradford Bridge. The river flowed along what is now the west side of Pancras Road until it was rerouted underground in 1825. The name "Battle Bridge" is linked to tradition that this was the site of a major battle between the Romans and the Celtic British Iceni tribe led by Boudica. According to folklore, King's Cross is the site of Boudica's final battle and some sources say she is buried under one of the platforms. Platforms 9 and 10 have been suggested as possible sites. Boudica's ghost is also reported to haunt passages under the station, around platforms 8–10.

Great Northern Railway (1850–1923)

King's Cross station was built in 1851–52 as the London terminus of the Great Northern Railway (GNR), and was the fifth London terminal to be constructed. It replaced a temporary station next to Maiden Lane (now York Way) that had been quickly constructed with the line's arrival in London in 1850, and had opened on 7 August 1850.

The station took its name from the King's Cross building, a monument to King George IV that stood in the area and was demolished in 1845. Construction was on the site of a smallpox hospital.

Plans for the station were made in December 1848 under the direction of George Turnbull, resident engineer for constructing the first  of the Great Northern Railway out of London. The station's detailed design was by Lewis Cubitt, the brother of Thomas Cubitt (the architect of Bloomsbury, Belgravia and Osborne House), and Sir William Cubitt (who was chief engineer of the Crystal Palace built in 1851, and consulting engineer to the Great Northern and South Eastern Railways). The design comprised two great arched train sheds, with a brick structure at the south end designed to reflect the arches behind.

The station, the biggest in England, opened on 14 October 1852. Originally it had one arrival and one departure platform (today's platforms 1 and 8), and the space between was used for carriage sidings. The platforms have been reconfigured several times. They were numbered 1 to 8 in 1972. In 2010 the station was reconfigured again and now has 12 platforms numbered 0 - 11. Suburban traffic quickly grew with the opening of stations at Hornsey in 1850, Holloway Road in 1856,  in 1859 and Seven Sisters Road (now ) in 1861. Midland Railway services to  via  and  began running from King's Cross on 1 February 1858. More platforms were added in 1862; No. 2 was full-length but No. 3 was stepped into the northern end of the station. A separate suburban station to the west of the main building, housing platforms 9–11  and known initially as "Kings Cross Main Line (Local) Station", opened in August 1875. It was followed by a connection to the Metropolitan line on 1 February 1878. Two platforms (now 5 and 6) were opened on 18 December 1893 to cater for increased traffic demands. An iron footbridge was built halfway down the train shed to connect all the platforms. By 1880, half the traffic at King's Cross was suburban.

A significant bottleneck in the early years of operations was at Gas Works tunnel underneath the Regent's Canal immediately to the north of the station, which was built with a single up track and a single down track. Commercial traffic was further impeded by having to cross over on-level running lines to reach the goods yard. Grade separation of goods traffic was achieved by constructing the skew bridge that opened in August 1877, and the second and third Gas Works tunnels opened in 1878 and 1892 respectively.

On 15 September 1881, a light engine and a coal train collided near the mouth of the Copenhagen Tunnel north of the station because of a signalman's error. One person was killed and another was severely injured. Bad weather contributed to occasional flooding in the tunnels. One such incident in July 1901 suspended all traffic from the station for more than four hours, which happened at no other London terminus.

King's Cross sustained no damage during World War I even though large amounts of high explosives were carried to the station in passenger trains during the war. When possible, trains were parked in tunnels in the event of enemy aircraft overhead.

London and North Eastern Railway (1923–1948)

Kings Cross came into the ownership of the London and North Eastern Railway (LNER) following the Railways Act 1921. The LNER made improvements to various amenities, including toilets and dressing rooms underneath what is now platform 8. The lines through the Gas Works tunnels were remodelled between 1922 and 1924 and improved signalling made it easier to manage the increasing number of local trains.

A number of famous trains have been associated with King's Cross, such as the Flying Scotsman service to Edinburgh. The Gresley A3 and later streamlined A4 Pacific steam locomotives handled express services from the 1930s until 1966.

King's Cross handled large numbers of troops alongside civilian traffic during World War II. Engine shortages meant that up to 2,000 people had to be accommodated on each train. In the early hours of Sunday 11 May 1941, two  bombs fell on the, then, platform 10 at the west side of the station, damaging a newspaper train in that platform and destroying the general offices, booking hall and a bar, and bringing down a large section of roof. Twelve people were killed.

On 4 February 1945, a passenger train to Leeds and Bradford stalled in Gasworks Tunnel, ran back and was derailed in the station. Two people were killed and 25 were injured. Services were not fully restored until 23 February.

British Rail (1948–1996)

Following nationalisation on 1 January 1948, King's Cross came under the management of British Railways' Eastern Region. Diesel services were introduced during the 1950s when steam was being phased out. All main line services were converted to diesel by June 1963. Platform numbers were reorganised in 1972, to run consecutively from 1 (east) to 14 (west). The track layout was simplified in the 1970s by reusing an old flyover for freight near the Copenhagen Tunnels at Holloway, and reducing the number of running lines through the Gas Works tunnels from six to four. At the same time, electrification started with the installation of a 25 kV overhead line to cater for suburban services as part of the Great Northern Suburban Electrification project. The works were completed on 3 April 1977, and electric services began running from King's Cross to Hertford,  and 

The construction of the Victoria line and its interchange at King's Cross was seen by British Rail as an opportunity to modernise the station. A single-storey extension containing the main passenger concourse and ticket office, designed in house, was built at the front of the station in 1972. Although intended to be temporary, it was still standing 40 years later, obscuring the Grade I-listed façade of the original station. Before the extension was built, the façade was hidden behind a small terrace of shops. The extension was demolished in late 2012, revealing the Lewis Cubitt architecture. In its place, the  King's Cross Square was created, and opened to the public on 26 September 2013.

On 10 September 1973, a Provisional IRA bomb exploded in the booking hall at 12.24 p.m., causing extensive damage and injuring six people, some seriously. The  device was thrown without warning by a youth who escaped into the crowd and was not caught.

King's Cross was a London terminus for InterCity 125 high speed services, along with Paddington. By 1982, almost all long-distance trains leaving King's Cross were 125s. The service proved to be popular, and the station saw regular queues across the concourse to board departing trains.

The King's Cross fire in 1987 started in the machine room for a wooden escalator between the main line station and the London Underground station's Piccadilly line platforms. The escalator burned and much of the tube station caught fire, killing 31 people, with smoke spreading to the main line station.

In 1987, British Rail proposed building a new station with four platforms for international trains through the Channel Tunnel, and four for Thameslink trains under King's Cross. After six years of design work, the plans were abandoned, and the international terminal was constructed at St Pancras.

These began service between King's Cross and Leeds on 2 October 1989, and to Edinburgh on 8 July 1991.

Privatisation (1996–present)

Before privatisation, the King's Cross area had a reputation for run-down buildings and prostitution in front of the main entrance. There was a major clean-up during the 1990s and the station's atmosphere was much improved by the end of the decade.

Following the privatisation of British Rail in 1996, express services into the station were taken over by the Great North Eastern Railway (GNER). The company refurbished the British Rail Mark 4 "Mallard" rolling stock used for long-distance services from King's Cross and the inauguration of the new-look trains took place in the presence of the Queen and the Duke of Edinburgh in 2003.

GNER successfully re-bid for the franchise in 2005 but surrendered it the following year. National Express East Coast took over the franchise in late 2007 after an interim period when trains ran under a management contract. In 2009, it was announced that National Express was no longer willing to finance the East Coast subsidiary, and the franchise was taken back into public ownership and handed over to East Coast in November. In March 2015 the franchise was re-privatised and taken over by Virgin Trains East Coast. In November 2017, Transport Secretary Chris Grayling announced the early termination of the East Coast franchise in 2020, three years ahead of schedule, following losses on the route by the operator. The current provider of ECML services is London North Eastern Railway.

Restoration

The £500 million restoration plan announced by Network Rail in 2005 was approved by Camden London Borough Council in 2007. It involved restoring and reglazing the original arched train shed roof and removing the 1972 extension at the front of the station and replacing it with an open-air plaza.

The new semi-circular departures concourse opened to the public in March 2012. Situated to the west of the station behind the Great Northern Hotel, it was designed by John McAslan and built by Taylor Woodrow Construction, part of Vinci. It caters for much-increased passenger flows and provides greater integration between the intercity, suburban and underground sections of the station.

Land between and behind Kings Cross and St Pancras stations is being redeveloped as King's Cross Central with around 2,000 new homes,  of offices and new roads. In the restoration, refurbished offices have opened on the east side of the station to replace ones lost on the west side, and a new platform, numbered 0, opened underneath them on 20 May 2010. Diesel trains cannot normally use this platform for environmental reasons. The restoration project was awarded a European Union Prize for Cultural Heritage / Europa Nostra Award in 2013.

In October 2021, Lumo commenced operating services to Edinburgh Waverley via Stevenage, Newcastle and Morpeth.

Future remodelling

In January 2018, it was announced that half the station would close for 3 months from January to March 2020 for remodelling work to the station and its approach, expected to cost £237 million. This includes rationalisation of the tracks, reopening the third tunnel to the approach of the station and closure of platform 10. In June 2021, Network Rail released a time lapse video showing the completion of the works.

Accidents and incidents

There have been many accidents at King's Cross over the years. The most serious were the King's Cross railway accident on 4 February 1945 which killed two people and injured 25 and a collision in Gasworks Tunnel on 15 September 1881 which killed one person and seriously injured another.  The most recent was on 17 September 2015 when a passenger train collided with the buffer stops, injuring fourteen people.

On 5 November 1979, Martin Allen was seen saying goodbye to his friends at King's Cross. He set off in the direction of the Piccadilly line platform, but he was never seen again. The station is also where Andrew Gosden was last seen before going missing on 14 September 2007. He had caught a train there from  under controversial and unexplained circumstances.

Other stations

King's Cross York Road

From 1863, part of King's Cross was an intermediate station. On the extreme east of the site, King's Cross York Road station was served by suburban trains from Finsbury Park before they followed the sharply curved and steeply graded York Road Tunnel to join the City Widened Lines to Farringdon, Barbican and Moorgate. In the other direction, trains from Moorgate came off the Widened Lines via the Hotel Curve, to platform 16 (latterly renumbered 14) which rose to the main line level. Services to and from Moorgate were diverted via the Northern City Line from November 1976. The station remained in occasional use until it was completely closed on 5 March 1977.

Great Northern Cemetery Station
The Great Northern Cemetery Station was built just to the east of the northern portal to Gasworks Tunnel, to connect the city to New Southgate Cemetery.

Services

The station hosts services on inter-city routes to the East of England, Yorkshire, North East England and eastern and northern Scotland, connecting to major cities and towns such as Cambridge, Peterborough, Hull, Doncaster, Leeds, Bradford, York, Middlesbrough, Sunderland, Newcastle, Edinburgh, Glasgow, Aberdeen and Inverness. Since June 2018, these major routes have been under government control, taking over from Stagecoach and Virgin.

Train services
Five train operating companies run services from King's Cross:

London North Eastern Railway
London North Eastern Railway operates high speed inter-city services along the East Coast Main Line. The standard off-peak service pattern is as follows:

1tph (fast service) to  via Newcastle

Govia Thameslink Railway
Govia Thameslink Railway operates outer-suburban services to North London, Hertfordshire, Cambridgeshire and West Norfolk under their Thameslink and Great Northern brands.

Thameslink

Great Northern
Peak times 2tph to  via  (express services)

Hull Trains
Hull Trains operates daily inter-city services to Hull and a limited weekday service to Beverley via the East Coast Main Line. Unlike other train companies in FirstGroup, Hull Trains operates under an open-access arrangement and is not a franchised train operating company.

Grand Central
Grand Central operates inter-city services to Bradford and Sunderland along the East Coast Main Line and is an open-access operator. On 23 May 2010 it began services to Bradford Interchange via Halifax, Brighouse, Mirfield, Wakefield, Pontefract and Doncaster which had originally been due to begin in December 2009.

On Monday-Friday, there are 4 trains per day to Bradford Interchange (of which 2 will call at Pontefract Monkhill) and 5 trains per day to Sunderland.

Lumo
Lumo operates five services per day to Edinburgh via Newcastle. Most trains run non-stop to Newcastle, then call only at Morpeth and Edinburgh, but some also call to pick up passengers at Stevenage.

Routes

London Underground station

King's Cross station shares a London Underground station with neighbouring St Pancras station. King's Cross St Pancras tube station is served by more lines than any other station on the London Underground. In , King's Cross St Pancras was the  station on the system, with  million passengers entering and exiting the station. It is in Travelcard Zone 1 and caters for both King's Cross and the neighbouring St Pancras railway station.

The station opened as part of the first section of Metropolitan Railway project on 10 January 1863; the first part of the Underground to open. A separate station for the Great Northern, Piccadilly and Brompton Railway (now the Piccadilly line) opened on 15 December 1906, with the City & South London Railway (now the Northern line) opening on 12 May 1907. The Metropolitan line platforms were moved to their current location in 1941.

The Victoria line platforms were opened on 1 December 1968. A major expansion to accommodate High Speed 1 at St Pancras opened in November 2009.

In popular culture

In fiction

The station is mentioned in Chapter 2 of E.M. Forster's 1910 novel Howards End, where it suggests "infinity" to the eldest Schlegel daughter, Margaret, and contrasted with the "facile splendours" of St. Pancras. In the Reverend Wilbert Awdry's 1957 children's book The Eight Famous Engines, Gordon the Big Engine undertakes a journey to London, hoping to reach King's Cross, but ends up at St Pancras instead.

In the 1994 children's book The Secret of Platform 13 by Eva Ibbotson. Platform 13 of King's Cross Station in London has been closed for years. Changes to the platform always result in failure for mysterious reasons. The reason is that the platform hides a gump, described as an "opening that opens once every nine years for nine days". The gump leads to the Island, a wonderful mythical paradise filled with both normal and magical creatures.

King's Cross features in the Harry Potter books, by J. K. Rowling, as the starting point of the Hogwarts Express. The train uses a secret Platform  accessed through the brick wall barrier between platforms 9 and 10. In fact, platforms 9 and 10 are in a separate building from the main station and are separated by two intervening tracks. Instead, the brick roof-support arches between platforms 4 and 5 were redressed by the film crew and used to represent a brick wall that does not exist between the real platforms 9 and 10.

Within King's Cross, a cast-iron "Platform " plaque was erected in 1999, initially in a passageway connecting the main station to the platform 9–11 annexe. Part of a luggage trolley was installed below the sign: the near end of the trolley was visible, but the rest had disappeared into the wall. The location quickly became a popular tourist spot amongst Harry Potter fans. The sign and a revamped trolley, complete with luggage and bird cage, were relocated in 2012, following the development of the new concourse building, and are now sited next to a Harry Potter merchandise shop. Because of the temporary buildings obscuring the façade of the real King's Cross station until 2012, the Harry Potter films showed St. Pancras in exterior station shots instead.

When The Wizarding World of Harry Potter at Universal Orlando Resort expanded to Universal Studios Florida, the Wizarding Worlds in both Diagon Alley at Universal Studios Florida and Hogsmeade at Universal's Islands of Adventure were connected with the Hogwarts Express. The Universal Studios Florida station is based on King's Cross station and Platform , including a quarter-scale replica of the façade of King's Cross as the entrance to the station and it was opened on 8 July 2014 alongside Harry Potter and the Escape from Gringotts replacing the Jaws ride and the Amity Island themed area based on the Jaws franchise which was permanently closed on 2 January 2012.

In film
The station, its surrounding streets and the railway approach feature prominently in the 1955 Ealing comedy film The Ladykillers. In the story, a gang robs a security van near the station after planning in a house overlooking the railway. When they fall out, members of the gang are dropped into passing goods wagons from the parapet of the Copenhagen Tunnel north of the station.

The 1986 crime drama film Mona Lisa is set around King's Cross. At the time, the downmarket and seedy area surrounding the station, coupled with urban decay, made it an ideal location. Subsequent early 1990s tabloid coverage of crime and prostitution around King's Cross referred back to the film.

Pet Shop Boys released a song titled "King's Cross" on the 1987 album Actually and the station was extensively filmed in for the group's 1988 feature film It Couldn't Happen Here. The band's singer Neil Tennant said that the station was a recognisable landmark coming into London, attempting to find opportunities away from the high unemployment areas of Northeast England at the time. The song was primarily about "hopes being dashed" and "an epic nightmare". The group subsequently asked filmmaker Derek Jarman to direct a background video for "King's Cross" for their 1989 tour, which featured a black and white sequence of juddery camera movements around the local area. Despite the song's reference to "dead and wounded on either side," it was actually released a few months before the King's Cross fire.

Monopoly
King's Cross station is a square on the British Monopoly board. The other three stations in the game are Marylebone, Fenchurch Street and Liverpool Street, and all four were LNER termini at the time the game was being designed for the British market in the mid-1930s.

References
Notes

Citations

Sources

External links
History of Kings Cross, at the LNER Encyclopedia
Pictures of the new concourse opened in March 2012 (Evening Standard website)

Video links

1935, Demonstration run of 'Silver Jubilee' to Grantham
1944, Retirement of driver Duddington 
1938, Stirling Single special train

Railway stations in the London Borough of Camden
Former Great Northern Railway stations
Railway stations in Great Britain opened in 1852
Railway stations served by Govia Thameslink Railway
Railway stations served by Grand Central Railway
Railway stations served by Hull Trains
Railway stations served by London North Eastern Railway
Railway stations served by Lumo
Network Rail managed stations
Railway termini in London
King's Cross Station
Grade I listed railway stations
Railway station
John McAslan railway stations
Lewis Cubitt railway stations
1852 establishments in England
Train driver depots in England
London station group